Ex Machina is a cyberpunk role-playing game book published by Guardians of Order covering a range from classic cyberpunk to postcyberpunk. It exists under both the cinematic Tri-Stat dX and d20 RPG systems.

Setting
Ex Machina includes a detailed retrospective on the cyberpunk genre, as well as lengthy advice on how to convey that genre in a role-playing environment without losing touch with its core themes.

In addition to information on setting design and genre handling, Ex Machina also includes four complete game settings for gamers to choose from, each of which takes the Cyberpunk genre in its own unique direction. The settings are named Heaven Over Mountain, Underworld, IOSHI and Daedalus.

System
There are two variants of the system for Ex Machina; Tri-Stat d8 and the d20 System.

Tri-Stat d8

Under Tri-Stat the game uses point-based character design and a two-die task resolution system. The game engine focuses on story over rules, and is known for its flexibility.

d20 System

The d20 System variation combines the points-based special abilities of Tri-Stat with the classes and levels of d20, and uses a hybrid task system mostly built from the d20's single-die high-roll method. The d20 variant is based on the Big Eyes, Small Mouth game system.  This variant is solely a fan-based production, and not endorsed by "Guardians of Order".

Current status
According to the Guardians of Order website, the company went out of business in 2006.  The "Guardians" staff have not released any information regarding the Tri-8 system or Ex Machina licensing

Reviews
Pyramid

References

External links
Ex Machina Mailing List

BESM/dX
Canadian role-playing games
Cyberpunk role-playing games
Guardians of Order games
Role-playing games introduced in 2004